Linton is a town in Victoria, Australia, off Glenelg Highway. Most of the town is located in Golden Plains Shire; however, a small section is in the Shire of Pyrenees. The Clarkesdale Bird Sanctuary lies to the south-east of the township, near Springdallah Creek.

History 
Linton was first settled about 1840 and was named after a pioneer family in an area.

Gold was found in 1848 in what later became known as Linton's Diggings. Chinese people, among others, mined the local shafts until the gold ran out. The miners remained in the area and set up market gardens. The Post Office opened on 5 November 1857 as Linton's and was renamed Linton around 1860. Much mining equipment can still be found in the Linton district.

The local Grenville Standard newspaper began publication in April 1895, and ran for 2,389 issues, ceasing 25 October 1941. The 1914–1918 years of the newspaper have been digitised as part of the Australian digitised newspapers project.

The ALP politician and Leader of the Federal Opposition 1922–28, Matthew Charlton, was born in Linton in 1866.

In December 1998, five firefighters were killed when they became trapped in a tanker while battling a bushfire near Linton.

References

External links 

 
http://www.lintonhistory.org.au/
www.lintoncommunity.com – Linton community website
travelmate.com.au – Linton, Victoria

Towns in Victoria (Australia)
Mining towns in Victoria (Australia)
Western District (Victoria)
1840 establishments in Australia